Henry S. Burroughs  (February 3, 1845 – March 31, 1878) was an American professional baseball player, for the Washington Olympics in 1871 and 1872. He died at age 33 in Newark New Jersey of undisclosed causes

External links

Major League Baseball outfielders
Washington Olympics (NABBP) players
Washington Olympics players
Baseball players from Newark, New Jersey
19th-century baseball players
1845 births
1878 deaths